Buy is a rural locality (a selo) in Bichursky District, Republic of Buryatia, Russia. The population was 659 as of 2010. There are 6 streets.

Geography 
Buy is located 34 km east of Bichura (the district's administrative centre) by road. Sloboda is the nearest rural locality.

References 

Rural localities in Bichursky District